Hajji Bekandeh (also Romanized as Ḩājjī Bekandeh; also known as Ḩājjī Bekandī) is a village in Hajji Bekandeh-ye Koshk-e Bijar Rural District, Khoshk-e Bijar District, Rasht County, Gilan Province, Iran. At the 2006 census, its population was 838, in 249 families.

References 

Populated places in Rasht County